Aljoša Vojnović (born 24 October 1985) is a Croatian retired footballer. He currently works as a columnist for Telesport and as a pundit at Nova TV.

Club career 
Aljoša Vojnović started his professional career in NK Osijek. In NK Osijek he was not in the first team plans so he tried his luck abroad. He was on try outs in a famous German club TSV 1860 München where the coach Marco Kurz said "he left a good impression on him". The transfer didn't go through.  Later on, he tried getting an acquisition in some other clubs. First, in Norwegian club Raufoss Fotball and second, in Austrian Kärnten. Although he did spend a whole year in Kärnten (where he scored a few times) he returned to Croatia in the season 2008–2009 by signing a contract with newly promoted Croatia Sesvete. Some good performances and 4 goals in the Prva HNL which made him the club's second best scorer earned him a contract with NK Slaven Belupo.

On 25 June 2009 NK Slaven Belupo have announced that they have signed young striker Aljoša Vojnović from NK Croatia Sesvete on a three-year contract worth €50 000. NK Slaven Belupo will also have to pay a percentage of players future transfer to NK Croatia Sesvete.

After his three years in Slaven, and a spell in Iran, Vojnović moved to RNK Split where he, a striker at the beginning of his career, established himself further as a defensive midfielder.

In the first days of 2015, he moved back to his first club, NK Osijek, only to move later that year to Dinamo București where he became captain. He was released from Dinamo in December 2015.

References

External links
 
Aljoša Vojnović at Sportnet.hr 

1985 births
Living people
Sportspeople from Osijek
Association football forwards
Croatian footballers
Croatia under-21 international footballers
NK Osijek players
NK Metalac Osijek players
Raufoss IL players
FC Kärnten players
NK Croatia Sesvete players
NK Slaven Belupo players
Sanat Mes Kerman F.C. players
RNK Split players
FC Dinamo București players
NK Istra 1961 players
Zalaegerszegi TE players
Kaposvári Rákóczi FC players
Croatian Football League players
Norwegian First Division players
2. Liga (Austria) players
Persian Gulf Pro League players
Liga I players
Nemzeti Bajnokság II players
Nemzeti Bajnokság I players
Croatian expatriate footballers
Expatriate footballers in Norway
Expatriate footballers in Austria
Croatian expatriate sportspeople in Austria
Expatriate footballers in Iran
Expatriate footballers in Romania
Expatriate footballers in Hungary
Croatian expatriate sportspeople in Norway
Croatian expatriate sportspeople in Iran
Croatian expatriate sportspeople in Romania
Croatian expatriate sportspeople in Hungary